Chaulhac is a commune in the Lozère department in southern France.

Notable people

Guy de Chauliac, a physician, was born here around 1300. He is known for his lengthy and influential treatise on surgery in Latin, titled "Chirurgia Magna." He was the personal physician and surgeon to Pope Clement VI (1342–1352), Pope Innocent VI (1352–1362), and Pope Urban V (1362–1370).)

See also
Communes of the Lozère department

References

Communes of Lozère